"So Addictive" is a song by Danish pop singer Christine Milton. It was released on 20 September 2004 as the fourth and final single from her debut album Friday.

Track listing

Credits and personnel
Writers: Lars Halvor Jensen, Johannes Jørgensen, Remee
Producer, arrangement and mixing: Lars Halvor Jensen, Martin Michael Larsson, Johannes Jørgensen
Instruments: Lars Halvor Jensen, Martin Michael Larsson
Guitars: Johannes "Johs" Jørgensen

External links
So Addictive at Discogs

2004 singles
Christine Milton songs
Songs written by Remee
Songs written by Lars Halvor Jensen
Songs written by Johannes Jørgensen
2004 songs
RCA Records singles